The men's 400 metres hurdles event at the 2006 World Junior Championships in Athletics was held in Beijing, China, at Chaoyang Sports Centre on 16, 17 and 18 August.

Medalists

Results

Final
18 August

Semifinals
17 August

Semifinal 1

Semifinal 2

Semifinal 3

Heats
16 August

Heat 1

Heat 2

Heat 3

Heat 4

Heat 5

Participation
According to an unofficial count, 39 athletes from 32 countries participated in the event.

References

400 metres hurdles
400 metres hurdles at the World Athletics U20 Championships